Aleksandar Glišić (born 3 September 1992) is a Bosnian footballer, who currently plays for Ararat Yerevan in the Armenian Premier League.

Club career
Born in Bosnia and Herzegovina, Glisic started his senior career with FK Sloga Srbac. In 2016. he signed for FK Radnik Bijeljina in the Premier League of Bosnia and Herzegovina, where he made over sixty-seven appearances and scored eight goals. Thereafter, he played for Urartu and Alashkert.

In August 2019, Glišić signed for Alashkert from Banants.

In January 2022, Glišić signed for Dinamo Samarqand.

On 14 June 2022, Ararat Yerevan announced the signing of Glišić.

References

External links 
 Official Instagram

1992 births
Living people
Association football forwards
Bosnia and Herzegovina footballers
FK Radnik Bijeljina players
FC Urartu players
FC Alashkert players
Premier League of Bosnia and Herzegovina players
Armenian Premier League players
Bosnia and Herzegovina expatriate footballers
Expatriate footballers in Armenia
Bosnia and Herzegovina expatriate sportspeople in Armenia